The Rally for the Republic – Republican Party of Czechoslovakia (abbreviated to Republikáni or SPR–RSČ) is a minor political party in the Czech Republic, strongly opposed to the EU, NATO and immigration. The party and its leader Miroslav Sládek are particularly known for their radical attitudes towards Roma people (antiziganism) and Germans.

History
The party was founded on December 30, 1989 as one of the first political parties in post-communist Czechoslovakia. It peaked in 1996 Czech legislative election with 8% of votes (485,072 electors, 18 seats in the 200-seat Chamber of Deputies) but declined after that, and in 2001 disbanded due to financial irregularities – specifically the theft of party funds by the chairman, who used the money to fund his luxury lifestyle.

The party was reestablished in 2001 as Republicans of Miroslav Sládek (RMS, Republikáni Miroslava Sládka). Sládek immediately set up a new party; to distinguish it from the other "republican" parties his name was added. The new party failed to attract a significant number of votes (0.9% during 2002 Czech legislative election was the highest). For the 2006 elections RMS joined with the National Party, which obtained 0.1% of votes. The number of active members was estimated to be in the dozens at most.

On May 17, 2008 this new party merged with five other minor parties to form the SPR–RSČ. The renewed party chose Sládek as chairman, yet even after the merger the party failed to gain political traction. For non-compliance with statutory obligations, the Supreme Administrative Court of the Czech Republic (acting on a Czech government proposal) decided in December 2010 to temporarily suspend the Republican party's activities. Finally, on 15 May 2013, the Court ordered its complete dissolution.

The party was reestablished once again in February 2016 under the name Rally for the Republic – Republican Party of Czechoslovakia 2016.

Election results

Chamber of Deputies

European Parliament

Presidential

References

External links
Official website 

 
National conservative parties in the Czech Republic
Anti-Romanyist parties in the Czech Republic
Eurosceptic parties in the Czech Republic
Far-right political parties in the Czech Republic
Nationalist parties in the Czech Republic
Right-wing populism in the Czech Republic
Anti-German sentiment in Europe
1989 establishments in Czechoslovakia
Political parties established in 1989
Right-wing populist parties
Euronat members
Right-wing parties in the Czech Republic
Opposition to NATO